The Würzburg tramway network is a network of tramways forming part of the public transport system in Würzburg, a city in the federal state of Bavaria, Germany.

History
The first horse-drawn tramway opened in Würzburg in 1892. The first electric trams went into operation in Würzburg in 1900.

Beginning in the 1990s, a concerted effort was made to move Würzburg's tramlines into their own rights-of-way and convert them more to a light rail (Stadtbahn) type of operation over the traditional tram system operating in regular road traffic. Currently, most of Würzburg tramlines, outside of sections downtown and in the Sanderau district, operate as light rail in their own rights-of-way. In addition, low-floor light rail vehicles were purchased.

Lines 
, the network was made up of the following five lines:

* The figure refers to both directions, ie a complete round trip.

Rolling stock
The Würzburg tram fleet consists of:

GTW-D8 (6 trams, built by Düwag in 1968)
GT-E (14 trams, built by LHB in 1989)
GT-N (20 trams, built by Alstom LHB in 1995)

See also
Trams in Germany
List of town tramway systems in Germany

References

Notes

Bibliography

External links

 Würzburger Versorgungs- und Verkehrs-GmbH (WVV) – official site 
 Verkehrsunternehmens-Verbund Mainfranken GmbH (VVM) – official site 
 
 

Wurzburg
Rail transport in Bavaria
Würzburg
750 V DC railway electrification
Würzburg